Solymus monotypic beetle genus in the family Cerambycidae described by Jean Théodore Lacordaire in  1872. Its single species, Solymus pictor, was described by Johann Christoph Friedrich Klug in 1829.

References

Tragocephalini
Beetles described in 1829